Maria Carratalà i Van den Wouver (Barcelona, 1899-1984) was a Catalan concert pianist, musicologist, music critic, translator and playwright.

She studied at the French School in Barcelona, and the Conservatori Superior de Música del Liceu, training under Modest Serra i Gonzàlez, Vicenç Costa i Nogueras (piano), Andreu Avel·lí Abreu i Boy, and Francesc de Paula Sánchez i Gavagnach (theory and harmony). She finished ger studies in 1916. She was a lecturer, consultant and head of music of the Lyceum Club de Barcelona, who presided temporarily. She joined the World Congress of Women held in Paris in July 1934. In addition, she belonged to, 
Acció Catalana
Front Únic Femení Esquerrista de Catalunya (1932)
Institut de Cultura i Biblioteca Popular de la Dona
Club Femení i d'Esports de Barcelona

References

Bibliography
 Joan Llongueras i Badia, Joan Ramon i Maria Carratalà, Pau Casals Barcelona: Llibreria Verdaguer, 1927. (in Catalan)
 Teresa Julio, Recuperant la memòria històrica: Maria Carratalà, una traductora teatral de preguerra. Caplletra. Revista Internacional de Filologia, 61, 2016, pàg. 37-59. DOI: 10.7203/Caplletra.61.8448. (in Catalan)
 Tristan Bernard, trad. de Maria Carratalà Antonieta o la tornada del marquès: sainet en un acte, publicat en el llibre d'Enric Lluelles et al. La Festa del carrer Barcelona: Bonavia, 1935. (in Catalan)
 Maria Carratalà Florentina, publicat a Pausa revista Sala Beckett 25 (December 2006), p. 71-95 ISSN 1699-6070.  (in Catalan)

1899 births
Year of death unknown
Catalan pianists
Spanish musicologists
Spanish music critics
Musicians from Barcelona
Translators from Catalonia
Women writers from Catalonia
Spanish dramatists and playwrights
Women music critics
Spanish women dramatists and playwrights
Women writers about music
20th-century Spanish women writers